Phallobrycon is a genus of fish in the family Characidae endemic to Brazil.

Species
There are currently 2 recognized species in this genus:
 Phallobrycon adenacanthus Menezes, K. M. Ferreira & Netto-Ferreira, 2009
 Phallobrycon synarmacanthus Netto-Ferreira, Bastos, L. M. de Sousa & Menezes, 2016

References

Characidae
Fish of Brazil
Fish of South America
Freshwater fish genera
Endemic fauna of Brazil